St. Maarten Academy is a private secondary school in Sint Maarten with two campuses: Main campus in Cul-de-Sac, and PSVE in Ebenezer. It is subsidized by the Sint Maarten government.

It is an English medium school and opened in 1974.

References

External links
 The St. Maarten Academy

Education in Sint Maarten
Educational institutions established in 1974
Secondary schools in the Dutch Caribbean
Buildings and structures in Sint Maarten